John Loring, (born November 23, 1939), is design director emeritus of Tiffany & Co., where he was design director from 1979 to 2009. He is the author of numerous books about Tiffany's and art in general and a longtime contributor to Architectural Digest.

Biography
Prior to joining Tiffany in 1979 as design director, Loring was the New York bureau chief of Architectural Digest, as well as being one of the magazine's principal editorial contributors. He was also a professor of art at the graduate school of the University of California.

He earned a Bachelor of Arts degree in English literature from Yale University in 1960. After graduating, he continued his studies for four more years at the Ecole des Beaux Arts in Paris. Since 1964, his prints and paintings have been exhibited in Europe and the United States.

Loring continues to write on art and design. He serves on the Acquisitions Committee of The Museum of Modern Art's Department of Prints and Illustrated Books. He is also a serious collector of 20th-century furniture and ceramics. His interests in cooking and interior design have been recognized in major publications, including The New York Times Magazine, Bon Appetit, Food and Wine, Architectural Digest, House & Garden, L’Oeil, Arbitare, GQ, House Beautiful, Metropolitan Home, Gala, The New Yorker and French Vogue.  He was honored with the feature profile in The New Yorker (August 10, 1992).

In a foreword to Loring's 2011 photography book Christian Lost or Found, photojournalist Harry Benson praises his friend: "With every project he tackles, John Loring's instinctive brilliance produces a little magic, and he has one of the best eyes for photography in the world. You cannot but linger over his photographs – You find there a haunting elegance that stays with you."

Works
Public displays of Loring's work include US Customhouse; NYC; Prudential Life Institution Co. of America Eastern home office; Woodbridge, NJ; City of Scranton, PA; Western Savings, Philadelphia; Tivoli Gardens, Copenhagen. Loring's work is part of the permanent collections of numerous museums, including:
 Museum of Modern Art
 Whitney Museum of American Art
 Metropolitan Museum of Art
 Art Institute of Chicago
 Museum of Fine Arts, Boston
 Yale University Art Gallery
 Dallas Museum of Art
His one-man shows include Baltimore Museum of Art, 1972; Hundred Acres Gallery, NY, 1972; Pace Editions, 1973, 1977; Long Beach Museum of Art, 1975; A.D.I. Gallery, San Francisco, 1976; Holden Luntz Gallery, Palm Beach, 2011; Sarah Gavlak Gallery, 2012. His works have been exhibited in group shows at Philadelphia Museum of Art, 1971; New York Cultural Centre, 1972; Biennale Graphic Art, Ljublijana, Yugoslavia, 1973, 1977; Intergrafia, Cracow, Poland, 1974; Art Institute of Chicago, 1975; RISD, 1976.

Bibliography
 Tiffany Time . New York: Abrams, 2015  
 Christian Lost or Found. Brooklyn, New York: powerHouse Books, 2011
 Joseph Urban. New York: Abrams, 2010
 Tiffany Style: 170 Years of Design. New York: Abrams, 2008
 Tiffany Colored Gems. New York: Abrams, 2007
 Tiffany Pearls. New York: Abrams, 2006
 Tiffany Diamonds. New York: Abrams, 2005
 Tiffany's Palm Beach. New York: Abrams, 2005
 Greetings from Andy Warhol: Christmas at Tiffany's. New York: Abrams, 2004
 Tiffany Timepieces. New York: Abrams, 2004
 Tiffany in Fashion. New York: Abrams, 2003
 Tiffany Flora and Fauna. New York: Abrams, 2003
 Louis Comfort Tiffany at Tiffany & Co.. New York: Abrams, 2002
 Magnificent Tiffany Silver. New York: Abrams, 2001
 Paulding Farnham: Tiffany's Lost Genius. New York: Abrams, 2000
 Tiffany Jewels. New York: Abrams, 1999
 Tiffany's 20th Century: A Portrait of American Style. New York: Abrams, 1997
 A Tiffany Christmas. New York: Doubleday, 1996
 The Tiffany Gourmet Cookbook. New York: Doubleday, 1992
 Tiffany Parties. New York: Doubleday, 1989
 The Tiffany Wedding. New York: Doubleday, 1988
 Tiffany's 150 Years. New York: Doubleday, 1987
 Tiffany Taste. New York: Doubleday, 1986
 The New Tiffany Tablesettings. New York: Doubleday, 1981

Awards
 2010 - Artistic Achievement award, American Cancer Society
 2005 - Lifetime Achievement award, Museum of Art and Design, NYC
 2004 - Dallas Fashion award
 2002 - Pratt Legends award
 1996 - Honorary Doctor of Fine Arts degree from Pratt Institute
 1996 - Distinction in Design award from Fashion Group International.
 1988 - Design and Art Society's Edith Wharton Award for Excellence

References

External links
 Interview with Architectural Digest
 Official bio from publisher, Abrams Books
 "Party Pictures" (New York Social Diary)
 "An Adoring Loring Farewell" (New York Social Diary)
 "Tiffany & Co. For the Press" (Company Website)
 John Loring Papers at the Rare Book and Manuscript Library, Columbia University, New York, NY

Living people
1939 births
American art historians
American designers
Tiffany & Co.